The following list includes notable people who were born or have lived in Elgin, Illinois. For a similar list organized alphabetically by last name, see the category page People from Elgin, Illinois.

Authors and academics 

 E.C. "Mike" Alft, historian, author, and former mayor of Elgin
 Nina Burleigh, journalist and author
 Paul Flory, chemist; Nobel Prize winner (1974)
 Lloyd Hall, chemist
 Donella Meadows, environmentalist
 Jessica Mink, astronomer; co-discover of the rings around the planet Uranus
 John Platt, computer scientist
 Tom Shales, journalist; Pulitzer Prize winner (1988)
 Carleton Washburne, educator; author
Dwight Smith Young, physicist with the Manhattan Project

Business and invention 

 Max Adler, vice-president of Sears & Roebuck; benefactor of Adler Planetarium
 Lawrence B. Hamlin, Hamlin's Wizard Oil purveyor
 Lysander Hamlin, co-originator with John Austen Hamlin of Hamlin's Wizard Oil
 Earl "Madman" Muntz, marketer, car stereo and 4-track cartridge pioneer
 James Roche, chairman of General Motors
 James P. Liautaud,  industrialist, inventor and business theorist

Media and arts 

 Dan Andriano, musician
 BarlowGirl, Christian rock band
 Joe Becker, musician
 Bruce Boxleitner, actor
 Josh Caterer, songwriter, musician, singer
 Daniel de Marbelle, songwriter who wrote When They Ring Those Golden Bells 
 Citizen Way, Christian rock band
 Jim Gaffigan, comedian, actor, and author
 Mitzi Gaynor, actress and entertainer, lived in Elgin
 George Hamlin, opera singer and son of John Austin Hamlin
 John Austin Hamlin, magician
 Matt Hoffman, contestant on Big Brother 12
 Charles Ingalls, father of Laura Ingalls Wilder (Little House on the Prairie); spent part of his childhood in the nearby Campton Township
 Laurence Kaptain, recording artist; Dean at the College of Music and Dramatic Arts, Louisiana State University
 William LeBaron, playwright and movie producer
 Kevin Martin, musician
 Norman Mayell, musician (Sopwith Camel, Blue Cheer, Norman Greenbaum)
 Paleo, born David Strackany, folk singer-songwriter
 Jane Peterson, painter and artist
 John Qualen, actor
 Courtney Reed, stage actress, original Princess Jasmine in Aladdin on Broadway
 Marie Sidenius Zendt, singer

Military 

 Harry Chamberlin, U.S. Army brigadier general and Olympic medalist in equestrian events

Politics and law 

 Ray Barnhart, Texas State Representative
 Robert L. Bergman (1948-2013), Illinois State Representative
 DeGoy B. Ellis (1876-1949), Illinois state representative and lawyer
Thomas W. Ferry (1843-1845) Acting Vice President, US Senator
 Peter Fitzgerald, US senator (R-IL)
 Barbara Giolitto, Illinois State Representative
 Adam Neylon, Wisconsin legislator

Sports 

 Charlene Barnett (1928-1979), baseball player
 Ko Chandetka (born 1971), bodybuilder
 Earl Britton (1903-1973), football player
 Bethany Goldsmith (1927-2004), baseball player
 Harry Hanson (1896-1966), baseball player
 Hunkey Hines (1867-1928), baseball player
 Tony Kaufmann (1900-1982), baseball player
 Scott Kellar (born 1963), football player
 Ed McDonough (1886-1926), baseball player
 Lou North (1891-1974), baseball player
 Brian Oldfield (born 1945), Olympic shot putter
 David Otunga (born 1980) wrestler
 Erwin Renfer (1891-1957), baseball player
 Flynn Robinson (born 1941), basketball player
 Rick Short (born 1972), baseball player
 Roger Smithberg (born 1966), baseball player
 Ray Whipple (1893-1973), football player

References

Elgin
Elgin